K. J. Yesudas is a multilingual singer, singing Indian classical music, devotional, light music and film songs. His commercially published recordings span multiple genres. This page lists his major awards, honors and titles.

Titles and honours

National Film Award for Best Male Playback Singer

Holds the record of eight time winner of National Film Award for Best Male Playback Singer, the most by any male playback singer.

Kerala State Film Awards

Nandi Awards (Andhra Pradesh State Film Awards)

Tamil Nadu State Film Awards
 1992- Best Playback Singer - Mannan
 1989- Best Playback Singer - Nyaya Tharasu
 1988- Best Playback Singer - Various Films
 1982- Best Playback Singer - Moondram Pirai
 1977- Best Playback Singer - Andaman Kadhali, Madhuraiyai Meetta Sundharapandiyan

Filmfare Awards South

Filmfare Awards
 1980 - Best Male Playback Singer - Dilke Tukde from Dada
 1976 - Filmfare Special Award - Gori Tera from Chitchor

Kerala Film Critics Association Awards
 1977 - Best Male Playback Singer - Various films
 1978 - Best Male Playback Singer - Various films
 1979 - Best Male Playback Singer - Various films
 1980 - Best Male Playback Singer - Various films
 1981 - Best Male Playback Singer - Various films
 1982 - Best Male Playback Singer - Various films
 1983 - Best Male Playback Singer - Various films
 1984 - Best Male Playback Singer - Various films
 1985 - Best Male Playback Singer - Various films
 1986 - Best Male Playback Singer - Various films
 1990 - Best Male Playback Singer - Amaram
 1991 - Best Male Playback Singer - Bharatham
 1992 - Best Male Playback Singer - Kamaladalam, Sargam, Kudumbasammetham
 1993 - Best Male Playback Singer - Kalippattam, Sarovaram, Chenkol
 1994 - Best Male Playback Singer - Various films
 1995 - Best Male Playback Singer - Various films
 1996 - Best Male Playback Singer - Desadanam, Ee Puzhayum Kadannu, Thooval Kottaram
 1997 - Best Male Playback Singer - Kaliyattam, Aaraam Thampuran, Krishnagudiyil Oru Pranayakalathu
 1998 - Chalachitra Ratnam Award

Vanitha Film Awards
 2009 - Lifetime Achievement Award
 2009 - Best Playback Singer - Pazhassi Raja

Asianet Film Awards
 2015 - Lifetime Achievement Award
 2008 - Lifetime Achievement Award
 2000 - Best Playback Singer - Devadoothan

Other major titles, honours and awards
 Ranjakagayakasiromanih (The Crown Jewel among those singers whose music is charming) from TSN's Percussive Arts Centre Inc (TSNPAC), New Jersey, USA
Geetanjali citation by the ex-president of India Neelam Sanjiva Reddy
Star of India and Sangeetha Ratna (Music Jewel) awards by Lt. Governor of Pondicherry, Madan Mohan Lakhera
Senate member of the Italy-based International Parliament for Safety and Peace
Gaana Gandharvan by G. Sankara Kurup in 1968
Sangeetha Raja (Music King) by Chembai in 1974
Sur Singar Samsad Award in 1976
Kerala Sangeetha Nataka Akademi Fellowship (Classical music) in 1979
Sangeetha Chakravarthy (Music Emperor) by Pallavi Narasimachary in 1988
Sangeetha Sagaram (Music Ocean) in 1989
Asthana Gayakan (Official Singer) by Government of Kerala and Kerala Sangeetha Nataka Akademi in 1992
 Sangeet Natak Akademi Award in 1992
 Star of Cochin award in 1992
National Citizens Award presented by Mother Teresa in 1994
 An Honorary award for Outstanding Achievements in Music and Peace by UNESCO in 1999
Dr. Pinnamaneni and Seethadevi Foundation Award in 2000
Bhakti Sangeetha Sironmani in 2002
Sangeetha Kala Sudhakara by Vidyadheesha Teertha of Udupi Sri Krishna Temple in 2002
Swathi Ratnam (Swathi Jewel) by The Malayalee Club, Chennai in 2002
Asthana Vidwan (Official Teacher) by Udupi, Sringeri, and Raghavendra mutts in 2002
Sapthagiri Sangeetha Vidwanmani by Sri Thyagaraja Swamy Vari Temple Etc., Building Trust in 2002
Ranjini Sangeeta Kala Rathna Award by Sri Ranjini Trust, Chennai in 2002
Sangeetha Kalasikhamani by The Indian Fine Arts Society, Chennai in 2002
Korambayil Ahammed Haji Foundation Award in 2003
Wisdom International Award in 2005
 Ghantasala Melody King Award in 2005.
Mar Gregorius Award by Governor RL Bhatia in 2006
Kannada Chithra Sahitya Rathna Sri.Udayashankar Memorial Film Award - Lifetime Achievement Award in 2007
Kerala Ratna by Jaihind TV in 2008
Honorary Membership by the Vancouver Symphony Orchestra in 2008
 Sathyan Memorial Film Award for Lifetime Achievement in 2009
 Susheela National Music Award in 2009
 Jaycee Foundation Film Award for Best Singer in 2009
 Social Excellence Award in 2010
 Mirchi Awards for Best Singer and Lifetime Achievement in 2010
 Sree Chithira Thirunal National Award in 2010
 Swaralaya – Eenam Award in 2010 – Decade's Best Talent in Malayalam Music
 Symphony TV Lifetime Achievement Award in 2010
 Jaihind TV Film Award 2010 for Best Male Playback Singer Award for the song Pinne Ennodonnum from the movie Shikkar.
 Amrita-FEFKA Lifetime Achievement Award in 2011.
 Swaralaya - Devarajan Master Award in 2011.
 CNN-IBN Indian of the Year Award in 2011
 M. K. Raghavan Vakkeel Award, instituted by Sree Narayana Sangam in memory of M. K. Raghavan, former Labour Minister and S. N. Trust General Secretary, in 2012.
Limca Book of Records' People of the Year Award in 2012
 Harivarasanam Award, instituted by Travancore Devaswom Board in 2012
 Dharmashree award by Dharmashree Foundation, Eshwaramangala in 2012
 SIIMA Lifetime Achievement Award in 2013
 Dynamic Man of the Millennium Award by K. G. Foundation in 2013
 Harmony Award by Marthoma Research Academy in 2013.
SKGS Thyagaraja Seva Rathna Award in 2014
 Special Award by Government of Kerala for his overall contributions in diverse fields in 2014
 Padmabhushan B. Sarojadevi National Award by Bharathiya Vidya Bhavan in 2015
 Mazhavil Mango Music Lifetime Achievement Award in 2017
 Sangeetha Kalasarathy award by Sri Parthasarathy Swami Sabha in 2017
 Flowers Music Awards' Lifetime Achievement Award in 2018
 All-time Entertainer Award by Mazhavil Manorama in 2019
 C. R. Kesavan Vaidyar Award in 2019

References

External links
 Yesudas: Awards at Internet Movie Database

Awards
K. J. Yesudas